The following is a list of recurring Saturday Night Live characters and sketches introduced between October 7, 1978, and May 26, 1979, the fourth season of SNL.

Honker the Homeless Man
A Bill Murray sketch. Debuted October 14, 1978.
Appearances

At the Mall
Debuted October 14, 1978.

This sketch satirized the trend of suburban shopping malls sucking the life out of American cities.

Appearances

Woman to Woman
A talk show sendup where feminist Connie Carson (Gilda Radner) speaks with professional women about their careers. Debuted October 21, 1978.

Appearances

Uncle Roy
A Buck Henry sketch; made two appearances in season 4 and one in season 5. Debuted November 11, 1978.

Appearances

St. Mickey's Knights of Columbus
A small series of sketches set in the "spaghetti dinner" meetings of a Knights of Columbus lodge. Each sketch involves a prize being given to someone ironically in absentia and ends with a traditional song that only the least expected person remembers the words to. Debuted November 11, 1978.

Appearances

Chico Escuela
Chico Escuela (literal translation: "Boy School", but more likely "Little School," as Chico means small or little when used as an adjective - essentially little education), played by Garrett Morris, was the Weekend Update sports correspondent. A retired Hispanic ballplayer with limited command of the English language, he wrote the tell-all book Bad Stuff 'Bout the Mets ("Ed Kranepool - he once borrow Chico's soap and no give it back"). The character was first introduced in a St. Mickey's Knights of Columbus sketch, but subsequently Escuela appeared solely on Update.

Typically he would be introduced by Jane Curtin, thus compelling him to say, "Thank you, Hane!" Soon would follow his standard catchphrase: "Beisbol been berry, berry good to me!" In spring training of 1979, Chico's unsuccessful comeback attempt was documented on several Update segments.

The segments were actually filmed at the Miller Huggins Field in St. Petersburg, Florida. Sammy Sosa, at the peak of his stardom in the late 1990s, would sometimes repeat Chico's catchphrase as a joke to the media, albeit in his true-to-life strong Hispanic accent.

Appearances

Telepsychic
Telepsychic was a sketch that only appeared twice, and opened the show both times. featuring Dan Aykroyd as Ray, a pseudopsychic with his own TV show. For the character, Aykroyd wore a blonde wig and tinted sunglasses, and sat behind a desk with five telephones on it. Callers asked for advice about personal issues, and his flippant delivery and outrageous suggestions while answering phones are indicative that he was a fraud. In response to a series of questions that involved time spans, his answer for each was, "Ohhhh... about a month."

Episodes featuring Telepsychic
December 9, 1978 host: Eric Idle
May 19, 1979 host: Maureen Stapleton

Candy Slice
Candy Slice was a character played by Gilda Radner on Saturday Night Live. An intense but troubled rock and roll artist, Candy Slice recorded a track for an album in a sketch on December 9, 1978, in an installment Eric Idle hosted, the song being "If You Look Close (You Can See My Tits)."

She also performed in the Rock Against Yeast sketch on February 17, 1979, while Ricky Nelson was hosting. Her song was dedicated to Mick Jagger and was about how Candy Slice was his "biggest funked-up fan". Other musician impressions in the sketch included Olivia Newton-John (Laraine Newman), Bob Marley (Garrett Morris) and Dolly Parton (Jane Curtin).

Candy Slice was based loosely on punk rock pioneer Patti Smith.

Episodes featuring Candy Slice
December 9, 1978 host: Eric Idle
February 17, 1979 host: Ricky Nelson

The Widettes
A Dan Aykroyd, John Belushi, Jane Curtin, and Gilda Radner sketch. Debuted December 16, 1978.

Appearances

Miles Cowperthwaite
A Michael Palin sketch. Debuted January 27, 1979. The second appearance aired on May 12, 1979.

Dick Lanky
A Bill Murray sketch. Debuted February 17, 1979.

Rosa Santangelo
A Gilda Radner character, who appeared in three sketches over seasons 4 and 5. Debuted May 19, 1979.

References

Lists of recurring Saturday Night Live characters and sketches
Saturday Night Live in the 1970s
Saturday Night Live
Saturday Night Live